Bombina microdeladigitora is a species of toad in the family Bombinatoridae  endemic to Guangxi, Hubei and Sichuan in China. It is commonly known by several names including Guangxi firebelly toad, Hubei firebelly toad, large-spined bell toad, Lichuan bell toad, small-webbed bell toad, and Yunnan firebelly toad. Its natural habitats are subtropical or tropical moist montane forests, temperate forests, rivers, swamps, and freshwater marshes. It is threatened by habitat loss.

References

Bombina
Amphibians described in 1978
Taxonomy articles created by Polbot